The Tauranga River is a river of the Bay of Plenty Region of New Zealand's North Island. It flows generally north from its sources in Te Urewera, past the settlement of Waimana, to join the Whakatāne River just to the south-west of the town of Tāneatua. The lower section from the confluence of the Waiti Stream near Tahora down to the Whakatane River was also previously known by the unofficial name Waimana River – only the higher section was called Tauranga River.

See also
List of rivers of New Zealand

References

Rivers of the Bay of Plenty Region
Rivers of New Zealand